Club Valencia is a Maldivian football club based in Malé, Maldives. Nicknamed The Sunrisers, the club competes in the Dhivehi Premier League, the top tier of Maldivian football.

History
The notion of establishing a football club named Club Valencia arose in the late 1970s from the players of blue and gold teams participating in the Junior Football Pool organized by National Sports Academy.

The first two names proposed to the government for approval as the name of the club were Youth Recreation Movement and Juvenile Valencia Atletico; both were rejected. The third name, Club Valencia was then approved by the government.

The chairman of the club is Mr. Adheel Jaleel who was elected to the post in 2015.

Players

Current squad

Honours

Dhivehi League: 5
 2001, 2002, 2003, 2004, 2008
Second Division: 1
 2020
Maldives FA Cup: 5
 1988, 1995, 1999, 2004, 2016
FAM Youth Championship: 2
 2013, 2022
Maldives Cup Winners' Cup: 3
 1998, 2004, 2007
POMIS Cup: 3
 1992, 1996, 2001
Charity Shield: 1
 2009
Veterans
Veterans Cup: 3
 2010, 2011, 2012
Veterans Association Cup – Veterans: 1
 2014
Veterans Association Cup – Masters: 1
 2014

Performance in AFC competitions
 AFC Champions League: 1 appearance
2002–03: Qualifying East – 2nd Round

 Asian Club Championship: 6 appearances
1986: Qualifying Stage
1995: Preliminary Round
1995: First Round
1996: Second Round
1999: First Round
2000: Second Round

AFC Cup: 4 appearances
2004: Group Stage
2005: Group Stage
2009: Group Stage
2017: Preliminary Round

Asian Cup Winners Cup: 2 appearances
1996/97: Second Round
2000/01: First Round

References

External links
Official website (archived)

Football clubs in the Maldives
Football clubs in Malé
Association football clubs established in 1979
1979 establishments in the Maldives
Dhivehi League
Dhivehi Premier League clubs